Events in the year 1693 in Norway.

Incumbents
Monarch: Christian V

Events

Arts and literature

Births

21 October – Frederik Nannestad, bishop (died 1774).

Full date unknown
Hartvig Jentoft, merchant (died 1739).
Christian Stub, jurist, law historian and civil servant (died 1736).

Deaths

See also

References